The 2011 Cyprus Rally, officially the 39th FxPro Cyprus Rally, was the eleventh and final round of the 2011 Intercontinental Rally Challenge (IRC) season. The eleven stage gravel rally took place over 3–5 November 2011.

The rally offered double points towards the respective IRC championships, meaning that the overall rally winner, as well as class winners, gained 50 points instead of the usual 25. With victory, Andreas Mikkelsen became the youngest IRC champion, winning the title by 1.5 points ahead of Jan Kopecký.

Introduction
The rally, which was run for the 39th time, was based in Paphos – moving from its 2010 base of Limassol – with a super special stage making up Thursday's running. On Friday, four stages covering  were run, with the final six stages, consisting of  being completed on the Saturday.

With double points on offer for the rally, six drivers remained in championship contention after the previous event at Rally Scotland. Jan Kopecký held the championship lead with 131 points, ahead of Škoda Motorsport team-mate and defending champion Juho Hänninen, who was six points in arrears. Team Peugeot Belgium-Luxembourg's Thierry Neuville, the highest placed Peugeot driver, held third place with 115 points, ahead of Škoda UK's Andreas Mikkelsen on 111.5, Bryan Bouffier of Peugeot France on 110.5 and Freddy Loix, representing the BFO-Škoda Rally Team, on 103. The championship battle was later reduced to five drivers, as Bouffier did not travel to Cyprus.

Results

Overall

Special stages

References

External links 
 The official website for the rally
 The official website of the Intercontinental Rally Challenge

Cyprus
Rally
Cyprus Rally